Ards and North Down Borough Council is a local authority in Northern Ireland that was established on 1 April 2015. It replaced Ards Borough Council and North Down Borough Council. The first elections to the authority were on 22 May 2014 and it acted as a shadow authority, prior to the creation of the Ards and North Down district on 1 April 2015.

The district was originally called "North Down and Ards" but the council was known as "Ards and North Down District Council". Councillors on the transitional shadow authority (prior to the council's official creation) voted on 15 December 2014 to submit an application to the Department of the Environment to change the name to East Coast Borough Council with effect from 1 April 2015. Negative public reaction to the proposed name prompted a rethink. The district name "Ards and North Down" was not finalised until 2016. The transfer of the borough charter from North Down Borough Council was delayed until after the district naming.

Mayoralty

Mayor

Deputy Mayor

Councillors
For the purpose of elections the council is divided into seven district electoral areas (DEA):

Party strengths

Councillors by electoral area

† Co-opted to fill a vacancy since the election.‡ Changed party affiliation since the election.Last updated 8 February 2023.

For further details see 2019 Ards and North Down Borough Council election.''

Population
The area covered by the new borough has 163,659 residents according to the 2021 Northern Ireland census.

References

District councils of Northern Ireland
Politics of County Down
2015 establishments in Northern Ireland